This is a list of the bird species recorded in Saudi Arabia. The avifauna of Saudi Arabia include a total of 552 species, of which 12 have been introduced by humans. 25 species are globally threatened.

This list's taxonomic treatment (designation and sequence of orders, families and species) and nomenclature (common and scientific names) follow the conventions of The Clements Checklist of Birds of the World, 2022 edition. The family accounts at the beginning of each heading reflect this taxonomy, as do the species counts found in each family account. Introduced and accidental species are included in the total counts for Saudi Arabia.

The following tags have been used to highlight several categories. The commonly occurring native species do not fall into any of these categories.

(A) Accidental – a species that rarely or accidentally occurs in Saudi Arabia
(I) Introduced – a species introduced to Saudi Arabia as a consequence, direct or indirect, of human actions
(Ex) Extirpated – a species that no longer occurs in Saudi Arabia although populations exist elsewhere
(X) Extinct - a species or subspecies that no longer exists

Ostriches
Order: StruthioniformesFamily: Struthionidae

The ostrich is a flightless bird native to Africa. It is the largest living species of bird. It is distinctive in its appearance, with a long neck and legs and the ability to run at high speeds.

Common ostrich, Struthio camelus reintroduced
North African ostrich, Struthio camelus camelus (I)
Arabian ostrich, Struthio camelus syriacus (X)

Ducks, geese, and waterfowl
Order: AnseriformesFamily: Anatidae

The family Anatidae includes the ducks and most duck-like waterfowl, such as geese and swans. These birds are adapted to an aquatic existence with webbed feet, flattened bills, and feathers that are excellent at shedding water due to an oily coating.

Fulvous whistling-duck, Dendrocygna bicolor (A)
Lesser whistling-duck, Dendrocygna javanica (A)
Graylag goose, Anser anser
Greater white-fronted goose, Anser albifrons
Lesser white-fronted goose, Anser erythropus (A)
Mute swan, Cygnus olor (A)
Tundra swan, Cygnus columbianus
Whooper swan, Cygnus cygnus (A)
Knob-billed duck, Sarkidiornis melanotos (A)
Egyptian goose, Alopochen aegyptiaca (A)
Ruddy shelduck, Tadorna ferruginea
Common shelduck, Tadorna tadorna
Cotton pygmy-goose, Nettapus coromandelianus (A)
Garganey, Spatula querquedula
Northern shoveler, Spatula clypeata
Gadwall, Mareca strepera
Eurasian wigeon, Mareca penelope
Mallard, Anas platyrhynchos
Northern pintail, Anas acuta
Green-winged teal, Anas crecca
Marbled teal, Marmaronetta angustirostris (A)
Red-crested pochard, Netta rufina (A)
Common pochard, Aythya ferina
Ferruginous duck, Aythya nyroca
Tufted duck, Aythya fuligula
Smew, Mergellus albellus (A)
Red-breasted merganser, Mergus serrator (A)
White-headed duck, Oxyura leucocephala

Guineafowl
Order: GalliformesFamily: Numididae

Guineafowl are a group of African, seed-eating, ground-nesting birds which resemble partridges, but with featherless heads and spangled grey plumage.

Helmeted guineafowl, Numida meleagris

Pheasants, grouse, and allies
Order: GalliformesFamily: Phasianidae

The Phasianidae are a family of terrestrial birds. In general, they are plump (although they vary in size) and have broad, relatively short wings.

See-see partridge, Ammoperdix griseogularis (A)
Sand partridge, Ammoperdix heyi
Common quail, Coturnix coturnix
Harlequin quail, Coturnix delegorguei (A)
Chukar, Alectoris chukar
Philby's partridge, Alectoris philbyi
Arabian partridge, Alectoris melanocephala
Black francolin, Francolinus francolinus (I) (Ex)
Gray francolin, Ortygornis pondicerianus

Flamingos
Order: PhoenicopteriformesFamily: Phoenicopteridae

Flamingos filter-feed on shellfish and algae. Their oddly shaped beaks are specially adapted to separate mud and silt from the food they consume and, uniquely, are used upside-down.

Greater flamingo, Phoenicopterus roseus
Lesser flamingo, Phoeniconaias minor (A)

Grebes
Order: PodicipediformesFamily: Podicipedidae

Grebes are small to medium-large freshwater diving birds. They have lobed toes and are excellent swimmers and divers. However, they have their feet placed far back on the body, making them quite ungainly on land.

Little grebe, Tachybaptus ruficollis
Horned grebe, Podiceps auritus (A)
Red-necked grebe, Podiceps grisegena (A)
Great crested grebe, Podiceps cristatus
Eared grebe, Podiceps nigricollis

Pigeons and doves
Order: ColumbiformesFamily: Columbidae

Pigeons and doves are stout-bodied birds with short necks and short slender bills with a fleshy cere.

Rock pigeon, Columba livia
Stock dove, Columba oenas
Common wood-pigeon, Columba palumbus (A)
Rameron pigeon, Columba arquatrix
European turtle-dove, Streptopelia turtur
Dusky turtle-dove, Streptopelia lugens
Oriental turtle-dove, Streptopelia orientalis (A)
Eurasian collared-dove, Streptopelia decaocto
African collared-dove, Streptopelia roseogrisea
Red-eyed dove, Streptopelia semitorquata
Laughing dove, Spilopelia senegalensis
Namaqua dove, Oena capensis
Bruce's green-pigeon, Treron waalia

Sandgrouse
Order: PterocliformesFamily: Pteroclidae

Sandgrouse have small, pigeon like heads and necks, but sturdy compact bodies. They have long pointed wings and sometimes tails and a fast direct flight. Flocks fly to watering holes at dawn and dusk. Their legs are feathered down to the toes.

Pin-tailed sandgrouse, Pterocles alchata
Chestnut-bellied sandgrouse, Pterocles exustus
Spotted sandgrouse, Pterocles senegallus
Black-bellied sandgrouse, Pterocles orientalis
Crowned sandgrouse, Pterocles coronatus
Lichtenstein's sandgrouse, Pterocles lichtensteinii

Bustards
Order: OtidiformesFamily: Otididae

Bustards are large terrestrial birds mainly associated with dry open country and steppes in the Old World. They are omnivorous and nest on the ground. They walk steadily on strong legs and big toes, pecking for food as they go. They have long broad wings with "fingered" wingtips and striking patterns in flight. Many have interesting mating displays.

Great bustard, Otis tarda (A)
Arabian bustard, Ardeotis 
Macqueen's bustard, Chlamydotis macqueenii
Little bustard, Tetrax tetrax (A)

Cuckoos
Order: CuculiformesFamily: Cuculidae

The family Cuculidae includes cuckoos, roadrunners and anis. These birds are of variable size with slender bodies, long tails and strong legs.

White-browed coucal, Centropus superciliosus
Great spotted cuckoo, Clamator glandarius
Pied cuckoo, Clamator jacobinus
Dideric cuckoo, Chrysococcyx caprius (A)
Klaas's cuckoo, Chrysococcyx caprius
Common cuckoo, Cuculus canorus

Nightjars and allies
Order: CaprimulgiformesFamily: Caprimulgidae

Nightjars are medium-sized nocturnal birds that usually nest on the ground. They have long wings, short legs and very short bills. Most have small feet, of little use for walking, and long pointed wings. Their soft plumage is camouflaged to resemble bark or leaves.

Eurasian nightjar, Caprimulgus europaeus
Egyptian nightjar, Caprimulgus aegyptius
Nubian nightjar, Caprimulgus nubicus
Montane nightjar, Caprimulgus poliocephalus
Plain nightjar, Caprimulgus inornatus

Swifts
Order: CaprimulgiformesFamily: Apodidae

Swifts are small birds which spend the majority of their lives flying. These birds have very short legs and never settle voluntarily on the ground, perching instead only on vertical surfaces. Many swifts have long swept-back wings which resemble a crescent or boomerang.

Alpine swift, Apus melba
Common swift, Apus apus
Pallid swift, Apus pallidus
Little swift, Apus affinis
White-rumped swift, Apus caffer (A)
African palm-swift, Cypsiurus parvus

Rails, gallinules, and coots
Order: GruiformesFamily: Rallidae

Rallidae is a large family of small to medium-sized birds which includes the rails, crakes, coots and gallinules. Typically they inhabit dense vegetation in damp environments near lakes, swamps or rivers. In general they are shy and secretive birds, making them difficult to observe. Most species have strong legs and long toes which are well adapted to soft uneven surfaces. They tend to have short, rounded wings and to be weak fliers.

Water rail, Rallus aquaticus
Corn crake, Crex crex
Spotted crake, Porzana porzana
Lesser moorhen, Paragallinula angulata (A)
Eurasian moorhen, Gallinula chloropus
Eurasian coot, Fulica atra
Red-knobbed coot, Fulica cristata (A)
African swamphen, Porphyrio madagascariensis
Gray-headed swamphen, Porphyrio poliocephalus (A)
White-breasted waterhen, Amaurornis phoenicurus (A)
Little crake, Zapornia parva
Baillon's crake, Zapornia pusilla

Cranes
Order: GruiformesFamily: Gruidae

Cranes are large, long-legged and long-necked birds. Unlike the similar-looking but unrelated herons, cranes fly with necks outstretched, not pulled back. Most have elaborate and noisy courting displays or "dances".

Demoiselle crane, Anthropoides virgo
Common crane, Grus grus

Thick-knees
Order: CharadriiformesFamily: Burhinidae

The thick-knees are a group of largely tropical waders in the family Burhinidae. They are found worldwide within the tropical zone, with some species also breeding in temperate Europe and Australia. They are medium to large waders with strong black or yellow-black bills, large yellow eyes and cryptic plumage. Despite being classed as waders, most species have a preference for arid or semi-arid habitats.

Eurasian thick-knee, Burhinus oedicnemus
Senegal thick-knee, Burhinus senegalensis (A)
Spotted thick-knee, Burhinus capensis

Stilts and avocets
Order: CharadriiformesFamily: Recurvirostridae

Recurvirostridae is a family of large wading birds, which includes the avocets and stilts. The avocets have long legs and long up-curved bills. The stilts have extremely long legs and long, thin, straight bills.

Black-winged stilt, Himantopus himantopus
Pied avocet, Recurvirostra avosetta

Oystercatchers
Order: CharadriiformesFamily: Haematopodidae

The oystercatchers are large and noisy plover-like birds, with strong bills used for smashing or prising open molluscs.

Eurasian oystercatcher, Haematopus ostralegus

Plovers and lapwings
Order: CharadriiformesFamily: Charadriidae

The family Charadriidae includes the plovers, dotterels and lapwings. They are small to medium-sized birds with compact bodies, short, thick necks and long, usually pointed, wings. They are found in open country worldwide, mostly in habitats near water.

Black-bellied plover, Pluvialis squatarola
European golden-plover, Pluvialis apricaria (A)
Pacific golden-plover, Pluvialis fulva
Northern lapwing, Vanellus vanellus
Spur-winged lapwing, Vanellus spinosus
Red-wattled lapwing, Vanellus indicus
Sociable lapwing, Vanellus gregarius
White-tailed lapwing, Vanellus leucurus
Lesser sand-plover, Charadrius mongolus
Greater sand-plover, Charadrius leschenaultii
Caspian plover, Charadrius asiaticus
Kittlitz's plover, Charadrius asiaticus (A)
Kentish plover, Charadrius alexandrinus
Common ringed plover, Charadrius hiaticula
Little ringed plover, Charadrius dubius
Eurasian dotterel, Charadrius morinellus

Sandpipers and allies
Order: CharadriiformesFamily: Scolopacidae

Scolopacidae is a large diverse family of small to medium-sized shorebirds including the sandpipers, curlews, godwits, shanks, tattlers, woodcocks, snipes, dowitchers and phalaropes. The majority of these species eat small invertebrates picked out of the mud or soil. Variation in length of legs and bills enables multiple species to feed in the same habitat, particularly on the coast, without direct competition for food.

Whimbrel, Numenius phaeopus
Eurasian curlew, Numenius arquata
Bar-tailed godwit, Limosa lapponica
Black-tailed godwit, Limosa limosa
Ruddy turnstone, Arenaria interpres
Great knot, Calidris tenuirostris (A)
Red knot, Calidris canutus (A)
Ruff, Calidris pugnax
Broad-billed sandpiper, Calidris falcinellus
Curlew sandpiper, Calidris ferruginea
Temminck's stint, Calidris temminckii
Long-toed stint, Calidris subminuta (A)
Sanderling, Calidris alba
Dunlin, Calidris alpina
Little stint, Calidris minuta
Buff-breasted sandpiper, Calidris subruficollis (A)
Pectoral sandpiper, Calidris melanotos (A)
Jack snipe, Lymnocryptes minimus
Eurasian woodcock, Scolopax rusticola (A)
Solitary snipe, Gallinago solitaria (A)
Great snipe, Gallinago media (A)
Common snipe, Gallinago gallinago
Pin-tailed snipe, Gallinago stenura (A)
Terek sandpiper, Xenus cinereus
Red-necked phalarope, Phalaropus lobatus
Red phalarope, Phalaropus fulicarius (A)
Common sandpiper, Actitis hypoleucos
Green sandpiper, Tringa ochropus
Spotted redshank, Tringa erythropus
Common greenshank, Tringa nebularia
Marsh sandpiper, Tringa stagnatilis
Wood sandpiper, Tringa glareola
Common redshank, Tringa totanus

Buttonquail
Order: CharadriiformesFamily: Turnicidae

The buttonquail are small, drab, running birds which resemble the true quails. The female is the brighter of the sexes and initiates courtship. The male incubates the eggs and tends the young.

Small buttonquail, Turnix sylvatica (A)

Crab plover
Order: CharadriiformesFamily: Dromadidae

The crab plover is related to the waders. It resembles a plover but with very long grey legs and a strong heavy black bill similar to a tern. It has black-and-white plumage, a long neck, partially webbed feet and a bill designed for eating crabs.

Crab-plover, Dromas ardeola

Pratincoles and coursers
Order: CharadriiformesFamily: Glareolidae

Glareolidae is a family of wading birds comprising the pratincoles, which have short legs, long pointed wings and long forked tails, and the coursers, which have long legs, short wings and long, pointed bills which curve downwards. There are 3 species which occur in Saudi Arabia.

Cream-colored courser, Cursorius cursor
Collared pratincole, Glareola pratincola
Black-winged pratincole, Glareola nordmanni

Skuas and jaegers
Order: CharadriiformesFamily: Stercorariidae

The family Stercorariidae are, in general, medium to large birds, typically with grey or brown plumage, often with white markings on the wings. They nest on the ground in temperate and arctic regions and are long-distance migrants.

Pomarine jaeger, Stercorarius pomarinus
Parasitic jaeger, Stercorarius parasiticus

Gulls, terns, and skimmers
Order: CharadriiformesFamily: Laridae

Laridae is a family of medium to large seabirds, the gulls, terns, and skimmers. Gulls are typically grey or white, often with black markings on the head or wings. They have stout, longish bills and webbed feet. Terns are a group of generally medium to large seabirds typically with grey or white plumage, often with black markings on the head. Most terns hunt fish by diving but some pick insects off the surface of fresh water. Terns are generally long-lived birds, with several species known to live in excess of 30 years.

Slender-billed gull, Chroicocephalus genei
Gray-hooded gull, Chroicocephalus cirrocephalus (A)
Black-headed gull, Chroicocephalus ridibundus
Brown-headed gull, Chroicocephalus brunnicephalus (A)
Little gull, Hydrocoloeus minutus (A)
Mediterranean gull, Ichthyaetus melanocephalus (A)
White-eyed gull, Ichthyaetus leucophthalmus
Sooty gull, Ichthyaetus' hemprichii
Pallas's gull, Ichthyaetus ichthyaetus
Common gull, Larus canus
Herring gull, Larus argentatus
Yellow-legged gull, Larus michahellis (A)
Caspian gull, Larus cachinnans
Armenian gull, Larus armenicus
Lesser black-backed gull, Larus fuscus
Brown noddy, Anous stolidus
Sooty tern, Onychoprion fuscata (A)
Bridled tern, Onychoprion anaethetus
Little tern, Sternula albifrons
Saunders's tern, Sternula saundersi
Gull-billed tern, Gelochelidon nilotica
Caspian tern, Hydroprogne caspia
Black tern, Chlidonias niger (A)
White-winged tern, Chlidonias leucopterus
Whiskered tern, Chlidonias hybrida
Roseate tern, Sterna dougallii (A)
Common tern, Sterna hirundo
Arctic tern, Sterna paradisaea (A)
White-cheeked tern, Sterna repressa
Great crested tern, Thalasseus bergii
Sandwich tern, Thalasseus sandvicensis
Lesser crested tern, Thalasseus bengalensis

Tropicbirds
Order: PhaethontiformesFamily: Phaethontidae

Tropicbirds are slender white birds of tropical oceans, with exceptionally long central tail feathers. Their heads and long wings have black markings.

Red-billed tropicbird, Phaethon aethereus

Albatrosses
Order: ProcellariiformesFamily: Diomedeidae

The albatrosses are among the largest of flying birds, and the great albatrosses from the genus Diomedea have the largest wingspans of any extant birds.

White-capped albatross, Thalassarche cauta (A)

Southern storm-petrels
Order: ProcellariiformesFamily: Oceanitidae

The southern storm-petrels are relatives of the petrels and are the smallest seabirds. They feed on planktonic crustaceans and small fish picked from the surface, typically while hovering. The flight is fluttering and sometimes bat-like.

Wilson's storm-petrel, Oceanites oceanicus

Northern storm-petrels
Order: ProcellariiformesFamily: Hydrobatidae

Though the members of this family are similar in many respects to the southern storm-petrels, including their general appearance and habits, there are enough genetic differences to warrant their placement in a separate family.

Swinhoe's storm-petrel, Hydrobates monorhis (A)

Shearwaters and petrels
Order: ProcellariiformesFamily: Procellariidae

The procellariids are the main group of medium-sized "true petrels", characterised by united nostrils with medium septum and a long outer functional primary.

Jouanin's petrel, Bulweria fallax (A)
Flesh-footed shearwater, Ardenna carneipes 
Sooty shearwater, Ardenna grisea (A)
Tropical shearwater, Puffinus bailloni
Persian shearwater, Puffinus persicus

Storks
Order: CiconiiformesFamily: Ciconiidae

Storks are large, long-legged, long-necked, wading birds with long, stout bills. Storks are mute, but bill-clattering is an important mode of communication at the nest. Their nests can be large and may be reused for many years. Many species are migratory.

African openbill, Anastomus lamelligerus (A)
Black stork, Ciconia nigra
Abdim's stork, Ciconia abdimii
White stork, Ciconia ciconia

Frigatebirds
Order: SuliformesFamily: Fregatidae

Frigatebirds are large seabirds usually found over tropical oceans. They are large, black-and-white, or completely black, with long wings and deeply forked tails. The males have colored inflatable throat pouches. They do not swim or walk and cannot take off from a flat surface. Having the largest wingspan-to-body-weight ratio of any bird, they are essentially aerial, able to stay aloft for more than a week.

Great frigatebird, Fregata minor (A)

Boobies and gannets
Order: SuliformesFamily: Sulidae

The sulids comprise the gannets and boobies. Both groups are medium to large coastal seabirds that plunge-dive for fish.

Masked booby, Sula dactylatra
Brown booby, Sula leucogaster
Red-footed booby, Sula sula (A)

Cormorants and shags
Order: SuliformesFamily: Phalacrocoracidae

Phalacrocoracidae is a family of medium to large coastal, fish-eating seabirds that includes cormorants and shags. Plumage colouration varies, with the majority having mainly dark plumage, some species being black-and-white and a few being colourful.

Great cormorant, Phalacrocorax carbo
Socotra cormorant, Phalacrocorax nigrogularis

Pelicans
Order: PelecaniformesFamily: Pelecanidae

Pelicans are large water birds with a distinctive pouch under their beak. As with other members of the order Pelecaniformes, they have webbed feet with four toes.

Great white pelican, Pelecanus onocrotalus
Pink-backed pelican, Pelecanus rufescens

Hammerkop
Order: PelecaniformesFamily: Scopidae

The hammerkop is a medium-sized bird with a long shaggy crest. The shape of its head with a curved bill and crest at the back is reminiscent of a hammer, hence its name. Its plumage is drab-brown all over.

Hamerkop, Scopus umbretta

Herons, egrets, and bitterns
Order: PelecaniformesFamily: Ardeidae

The family Ardeidae contains the bitterns, herons and egrets. Herons and egrets are medium to large wading birds with long necks and legs. Bitterns tend to be shorter necked and more wary. Members of Ardeidae fly with their necks retracted, unlike other long-necked birds such as storks, ibises and spoonbills.

Great bittern, Botaurus stellaris
Yellow bittern, Ixobrychus sinensis (A)
Little bittern, Ixobrychus minutus
Gray heron, Ardea cinerea
Black-headed heron, Ardea melanocephala (A)
Goliath heron, Ardea goliath
Purple heron, Ardea purpurea
Great egret, Ardea alba
Intermediate egret, Ardea intermedia (A)
Little egret, Egretta garzetta
Western reef-heron, Egretta gularis
Black heron, Egretta ardesiaca (A)
Cattle egret, Bubulcus ibis
Squacco heron, Ardeola ralloides
Indian pond-heron, Ardeola grayii (A)
Striated heron, Butorides striata
Black-crowned night-heron, Nycticorax nycticorax

Ibises and spoonbills
Order: PelecaniformesFamily: Threskiornithidae

Threskiornithidae is a family of large terrestrial and wading birds which includes the ibises and spoonbills. They have long, broad wings with 11 primary and about 20 secondary feathers. They are strong fliers and despite their size and weight, very capable soarers.

Glossy ibis, Plegadis falcinellus
African sacred ibis, Threskiornis aethiopicus (A)
Northern bald ibis, Geronticus eremita (A)
Eurasian spoonbill, Platalea leucorodia
African spoonbill, Platalea alba (A)

Osprey
Order: AccipitriformesFamily: Pandionidae

The family Pandionidae contains only one species, the osprey. The osprey is a medium-large raptor which is a specialist fish-eater with a worldwide distribution.

Osprey, Pandion haliaetus

Hawks, eagles, and kites
Order: AccipitriformesFamily: Accipitridae

Accipitridae is a family of birds of prey, which includes hawks, eagles, kites, harriers and Old World vultures. These birds have powerful hooked beaks for tearing flesh from their prey, strong legs, powerful talons and keen eyesight.

Black-winged kite, Elanus caeruleus (A)
Bearded vulture, Gypaetus barbatus
Egyptian vulture, Neophron percnopterus
European honey-buzzard, Pernis apivorus
Oriental honey-buzzard, Pernis ptilorhynchus
Cinereous vulture, Aegypius monachus (A)
Lappet-faced vulture, Torgos tracheliotos
Rüppell's vulture, Gyps rueppelli (A)
Eurasian griffon, Gyps fulvus
Bateleur, Terathopius ecaudatus
Short-toed snake-eagle, Circaetus gallicus
Lesser spotted eagle, Clanga pomarina (A)
Greater spotted eagle, Clanga clanga
Booted eagle, Hieraaetus pennatus
Tawny eagle, Aquila rapax
Steppe eagle, Aquila nipalensis
Imperial eagle, Aquila heliaca
Golden eagle, Aquila chrysaetos
Verreaux's eagle, Aquila verreauxii
Bonelli's eagle, Aquila fasciata
Dark chanting-goshawk, Melierax metabates
Gabar goshawk, Micronisus gabar
Eurasian marsh-harrier, Circus aeruginosus
Hen harrier, Circus cyaneus
Pallid harrier, Circus macrourus
Montagu's harrier, Circus pygargus
Shikra, Accipiter badius
Levant sparrowhawk, Accipiter brevipes (A)
Eurasian sparrowhawk, Accipiter nisus
Northern goshawk, Accipiter gentilis (A)
Black kite, Milvus migrans
White-tailed eagle, Haliaeetus albicilla (A)
Pallas's fish-eagle, Haliaeetus leucoryphus (A)
Common buzzard, Buteo buteo
Long-legged buzzard, Buteo rufinus

Barn owls
Order: StrigiformesFamily: Tytonidae

Barn owls are medium to large owls with large heads and characteristic heart-shaped faces. They have long strong legs with powerful talons.

Barn owl, Tyto alba

Owls
Order: StrigiformesFamily: Strigidae

The typical owls are small to large solitary nocturnal birds of prey. They have large forward-facing eyes and ears, a hawk-like beak and a conspicuous circle of feathers around each eye called a facial disk.

Indian scops-owl, Otus bakkamoena
Arabian scops-owl, Otus pamelae
Eurasian scops-owl, Otus scops
Pallid scops-owl, Otus brucei
Eurasian eagle-owl, Bubo bubo
Pharaoh eagle-owl, Bubo ascalaphus
Arabian eagle-owl, Bubo milesi
Little owl, Athene noctua
Desert owl, Strix hadorami
Omani owl, Strix butleri (A)
Long-eared owl, Asio otus (A)
Short-eared owl, Asio flammeus

Hoopoes
Order: BucerotiformesFamily: Upupidae

Hoopoes have black, white and orangey-pink colouring with a large erectile crest on their head.

Eurasian hoopoe, Upupa epops

Hornbills
Order: BucerotiformesFamily: Bucerotidae

Hornbills are a group of birds whose bill is shaped like a cow's horn, but without a twist, sometimes with a casque on the upper mandible. Frequently, the bill is brightly coloured.

African gray hornbill, Tockus nasutus

Kingfishers
Order: CoraciiformesFamily: Alcedinidae

Kingfishers are medium-sized birds with large heads, long, pointed bills, short legs and stubby tails.

Common kingfisher, Alcedo atthis
White-throated kingfisher, Halcyon smyrnensis
Gray-headed kingfisher, Halcyon leucocephala
Collared kingfisher, Todiramphus chloris
Pied kingfisher, Ceryle rudis

Bee-eaters
Order: CoraciiformesFamily: Meropidae

The bee-eaters are a group of near passerine birds in the family Meropidae. Most species are found in Africa but others occur in southern Europe, Madagascar, Australia and New Guinea. They are characterised by richly coloured plumage, slender bodies and usually elongated central tail feathers. All are colourful and have long downturned bills and pointed wings, which give them a swallow-like appearance when seen from afar.

Somali bee-eater, Merops revoilii
White-throated bee-eater, Merops albicollis
Arabian green bee-eater, Merops cyanophrys
Blue-cheeked bee-eater, Merops persicus
European bee-eater, Merops apiaster

Rollers
Order: CoraciiformesFamily: Coraciidae

Rollers resemble crows in size and build, but are more closely related to the kingfishers and bee-eaters. They share the colourful appearance of those groups with blues and browns predominating. The two inner front toes are connected, but the outer toe is not.

European roller, Coracias garrulus
Abyssinian roller, Coracias abyssinica
Indian roller, Coracias benghalensis

Woodpeckers
Order: PiciformesFamily: Picidae

Woodpeckers are small to medium-sized birds with chisel-like beaks, short legs, stiff tails and long tongues used for capturing insects. Some species have feet with two toes pointing forward and two backward, while several species have only three toes. Many woodpeckers have the habit of tapping noisily on tree trunks with their beaks.

Eurasian wryneck, Jynx torquilla
Arabian woodpecker, Dendrocoptes dorae

Falcons and caracaras
Order: FalconiformesFamily: Falconidae

Falconidae is a family of diurnal birds of prey. They differ from hawks, eagles and kites in that they kill with their beaks instead of their talons.

Lesser kestrel, Falco naumanni
Eurasian kestrel, Falco tinnunculus
Red-footed falcon, Falco vespertinus
Amur falcon, Falco amurensis
Eleonora's falcon, Falco eleonorae
Sooty falcon, Falco concolor
Merlin, Falco columbarius
Eurasian hobby, Falco subbuteo
Lanner falcon, Falco biarmicus
Saker falcon, Falco cherrug
Peregrine falcon, Falco peregrinus

Old World parrots
Order: PsittaciformesFamily: Psittaculidae

Characteristic features of parrots include a strong curved bill, an upright stance, strong legs, and clawed zygodactyl feet. Many parrots are vividly coloured, and some are multi-coloured. Old World parrots are found from Africa east across south and southeast Asia and Oceania to Australia and New Zealand.

Alexandrine parakeet, Psittacula eupatria (I)
Rose-ringed parakeet, Psittacula krameri (I)

Old World orioles
Order: PasseriformesFamily: Oriolidae

The Old World orioles are colourful passerine birds. They are not related to the New World orioles.

Eurasian golden oriole, Oriolus oriolus

Bushshrikes and allies
Order: PasseriformesFamily: Malaconotidae

Bushshrikes are similar in habits to shrikes, hunting insects and other small prey from a perch on a bush. Although similar in build to the shrikes, these tend to be either colourful species or largely black; some species are quite secretive.

Black-crowned tchagra, Tchagra senegala

Monarch flycatchers
Order: PasseriformesFamily: Monarchidae

The monarch flycatchers are small to medium-sized insectivorous passerines which hunt by flycatching. .

African paradise-flycatcher, Terpsiphone viridis

Shrikes
Order: PasseriformesFamily: Laniidae

Shrikes are passerine birds known for their habit of catching other birds and small animals and impaling the uneaten portions of their bodies on thorns. A typical shrike's beak is hooked, like a bird of prey.

Red-backed shrike, Lanius collurio
Red-tailed shrike, Lanius phoenicuroides
Isabelline shrike, Lanius isabellinus
Brown shrike, Lanius cristatus (A)
Bay-backed shrike, Lanius vittatus (A)
Great gray shrike, Lanius excubitor
Lesser gray shrike, Lanius minor
Masked shrike, Lanius nubicus
Woodchat shrike, Lanius senator

Crows, jays, and magpies
Order: PasseriformesFamily: Corvidae

The family Corvidae includes crows, ravens, jays, choughs, magpies, treepies, nutcrackers and ground jays. Corvids are above average in size among the Passeriformes, and some of the larger species show high levels of intelligence.

Asir magpie, Pica asirensis
Eurasian magpie, Pica pica
Red-billed chough, Pyrrhocorax pyrrhocorax
Eurasian jackdaw, Corvus monedula (A)
House crow, Corvus splendens
Rook, Corvus frugilegus
Hooded crow, Corvus cornix
Pied crow, Corvus albus (A)
Brown-necked raven, Corvus ruficollis
Fan-tailed raven, Corvus rhipidurus
Common raven, Corvus corax (A)

Penduline-tits
Order: PasseriformesFamily: Remizidae

The penduline-tits are a group of small passerine birds related to the true tits. They are insectivores.

Eurasian penduline-tit, Remiz pendulinus (A)

Larks
Order: PasseriformesFamily: Alaudidae

Larks are small terrestrial birds with often extravagant songs and display flights. Most larks are fairly dull in appearance. Their food is insects and seeds.

Greater hoopoe-lark, Alaemon alaudipes
Thick-billed lark, Ramphocoris clotbey
Bar-tailed lark, Ammomanes cincturus
Desert lark, Ammomanes deserti
Black-crowned sparrow-lark, Eremopterix nigriceps
Horsfield’s bushlark, Mirafra javanica
Temminck's lark, Eremophila bilopha
Rufous-capped lark, Calandrella eremica
Greater short-toed lark, Calandrella brachydactyla
Bimaculated lark, Melanocorypha bimaculata
Calandra lark, Melanocorypha calandra (A)
Arabian lark, Eremalauda eremodites
Mediterranean short-toed lark, Alaudala rufescens
Turkestan short-toed lark, Alaudala heinei
Wood lark, Lullula arborea (A)
Eurasian skylark, Alauda arvensis
Oriental skylark, Alauda gulgula
Crested lark, Galerida cristata

Bearded reedling
Order: PasseriformesFamily: Panuridae

This species, the only one in its family, is found in reed beds throughout temperate Europe and Asia.

Bearded reedling, Panurus biarmicus (A)

Cisticolas and allies
Order: PasseriformesFamily: Cisticolidae

The Cisticolidae are warblers found mainly in warmer southern regions of the Old World. They are generally very small birds of drab brown or grey appearance found in open country such as grassland or scrub.

Graceful prinia, Prinia gracilis
Delicate prinia, Prinia lepida
Zitting cisticola, Cisticola juncidis

Reed warblers and allies
Order: PasseriformesFamily: Acrocephalidae

The members of this family are usually rather large for "warblers". Most are rather plain olivaceous brown above with much yellow to beige below. They are usually found in open woodland, reedbeds, or tall grass. The family occurs mostly in southern to western Eurasia and surroundings, but it also ranges far into the Pacific, with some species in Africa.

Thick-billed warbler, Arundinax aedon (A)
Booted warbler, Iduna caligata (A)
Sykes's warbler, Iduna rama
Eastern olivaceous warbler, Iduna pallida
Upcher's warbler, Hippolais languida
Olive-tree warbler, Hippolais olivetorum (A)
Icterine warbler, Hippolais icterina
Moustached warbler, Acrocephalus melanopogon
Sedge warbler, Acrocephalus schoenobaenus
Blyth's reed warbler, Acrocephalus dumetorum (A)
Marsh warbler, Acrocephalus palustris
Common reed warbler, Acrocephalus scirpaceus
Basra reed warbler, Acrocephalus griseldis
Great reed warbler, Acrocephalus arundinaceus
Clamorous reed warbler, Acrocephalus stentoreus

Grassbirds and allies
Order: PasseriformesFamily: Locustellidae

Locustellidae are a family of small insectivorous songbirds found mainly in Eurasia, Africa, and the Australian region. They are smallish birds with tails that are usually long and pointed, and tend to be drab brownish or buffy all over.

River warbler, Locustella fluviatilis (A)
Savi's warbler, Locustella luscinioides
Common grasshopper-warbler, Locustella naevia

Swallows
Order: PasseriformesFamily: Hirundinidae

The family Hirundinidae is adapted to aerial feeding. They have a slender streamlined body, long pointed wings and a short bill with a wide gape. The feet are adapted to perching rather than walking, and the front toes are partially joined at the base.

Plain martin, Riparia paludicola (A)
Gray-throated martin, Riparia chinensis
Bank swallow, Riparia riparia
Banded martin, Neophedina cincta (A)
Eurasian crag-martin, Ptyonoprogne rupestris
Rock martin, Ptyonoprogne fuligula
Barn swallow, Hirundo rustica
White-throated swallow, Hirundo albigularis (A)
Red-rumped swallow, Cecropis daurica
Common house-martin, Delichon urbica

Bulbuls
Order: PasseriformesFamily: Pycnonotidae

Bulbuls are medium-sized songbirds. Some are colourful with yellow, red or orange vents, cheeks, throats or supercilia, but most are drab, with uniform olive-brown to black plumage. Some species have distinct crests.

Red-vented bulbul, Pycnonotus cafer (I)
Red-whiskered bulbul, Pycnonotus jocosus (I)
White-spectacled bulbul, Pycnonotus xanthopygos
White-eared bulbul, Pycnonotus leucotis

Leaf warblers
Order: PasseriformesFamily: Phylloscopidae

Leaf warblers are a family of small insectivorous birds found mostly in Eurasia and ranging into Wallacea and Africa. The species are of various sizes, often green-plumaged above and yellow below, or more subdued with greyish-green to greyish-brown colours.

Wood warbler, Phylloscopus sibilatrix
Eastern Bonelli's warbler, Phylloscopus orientalis (A)
Yellow-browed warbler, Phylloscopus inornatus
Hume's warbler, Phylloscopus fuscatus (A)
Dusky warbler, Phylloscopus fuscatus (A)
Plain leaf warbler, Phylloscopus neglectus
Willow warbler, Phylloscopus trochilus
Common chiffchaff, Phylloscopus collybita
Brown woodland-warbler, Phylloscopus umbrovirens
Green warbler, Phylloscopus nitidus (A)
Greenish warbler, Phylloscopus trochiloides (A)
Arctic warbler, Phylloscopus borealis (A)

Bush warblers and allies
Order: PasseriformesFamily: Scotocercidae

The members of this family are found throughout Africa, Asia, and Polynesia. Their taxonomy is in flux, and some authorities place some genera in other families.

Scrub warbler, Scotocerca inquieta

Sylviid warblers, parrotbills, and allies
Order: PasseriformesFamily: Sylviidae

The family Sylviidae is a group of small insectivorous passerine birds. They mainly occur as breeding species, as the common name implies, in Europe, Asia and, to a lesser extent, Africa. Most are of generally undistinguished appearance, but many have distinctive songs.

Eurasian blackcap, Sylvia atricapilla
Garden warbler, Sylvia borin
Asian desert warbler, Curruca nana
Barred warbler, Curruca nisoria
Lesser whitethroat, Curruca curruca
Yemen warbler, Curruca buryi
Arabian warbler, Curruca leucomelaena
Eastern Orphean warbler, Curruca crassirostris
Cyprus warbler, Curruca melanothorax (A)
Menetries's warbler, Curruca mystacea
Rüppell's warbler, Curruca ruppeli
Eastern subalpine warbler, Curruca cantillans
Sardinian warbler, Curruca melanocephala (A)
Greater whitethroat, Curruca communis
Spectacled warbler, Curruca conspicillata (A)

White-eyes, yuhinas, and allies
Order: PasseriformesFamily: Zosteropidae

The white-eyes are small and mostly undistinguished, their plumage above being generally some dull colour like greenish-olive, but some species have a white or bright yellow throat, breast or lower parts, and several have buff flanks. As their name suggests, many species have a white ring around each eye. There is 1 species which occurs in Saudi Arabia.

Abyssinian white-eye, Zosterops abyssinicus

Laughingthrushes and allies
Order: PasseriformesFamily: Leiothrichidae

The laughingthrushes are somewhat diverse in size and colouration, but are characterised by soft fluffy plumage.

Arabian babbler, Argya squamiceps

Starlings
Order: PasseriformesFamily: Sturnidae

Starlings are small to medium-sized passerine birds. Their flight is strong and direct and they are very gregarious. Their preferred habitat is fairly open country. They eat insects and fruit. Plumage is typically dark with a metallic sheen.

European starling, Sturnus vulgaris
Rosy starling, Pastor roseus
Indian pied starling, Gracupica contra (I)
Common myna, Acridotheres tristis (I)
Bank myna, Acridotheres ginginianus (I)
Violet-backed starling, Cinnyricinclus leucogaster
Tristram's starling, Onychognathus tristramii

Thrushes and allies
Order: PasseriformesFamily: Turdidae

The thrushes are a group of passerine birds that occur mainly in the Old World. They are plump, soft plumaged, small to medium-sized insectivores or sometimes omnivores, often feeding on the ground. Many have attractive songs.

Mistle thrush, Turdus viscivorus
Song thrush, Turdus philomelos
Redwing, Turdus iliacus
Eurasian blackbird, Turdus merula
Yemen thrush, Turdus menachensis
Fieldfare, Turdus pilaris
Ring ouzel, Turdus torquatus
Black-throated thrush, Turdus atrogularis
Dusky thrush, Turdus naumanni (A)

Old World flycatchers
Order: PasseriformesFamily: Muscicapidae

Old World flycatchers are a large group of small passerine birds native to the Old World. They are mainly small arboreal insectivores. The appearance of these birds is highly varied, but they mostly have weak songs and harsh calls.

Spotted flycatcher, Muscicapa striata
Gambaga flycatcher, Muscicapa gambagae
Black scrub-robin, Cercotrichas podobe
Rufous-tailed scrub-robin, Cercotrichas galactotes
European robin, Erithacus rubecula
White-throated robin, Irania gutturalis
Thrush nightingale, Luscinia luscinia
Common nightingale, Luscinia megarhynchos (A)
Bluethroat, Luscinia svecica
Red-breasted flycatcher, Ficedula parva
Semicollared flycatcher, Ficedula semitorquata
Collared flycatcher, Ficedula albicollis
Rufous-backed redstart, Phoenicurus erythronota (A)
Common redstart, Phoenicurus phoenicurus
White-winged redstart, Phoenicurus erythrogaster (A)
Black redstart, Phoenicurus ochruros
Little rock-thrush, Monticola rufocinereus
Rufous-tailed rock-thrush, Monticola saxatilis
Blue rock-thrush, Monticola solitarius
Whinchat, Saxicola rubetra
European stonechat, Saxicola rubicola
Siberian stonechat, Saxicola maurus
African stonechat, Saxicola torquatus
Pied bushchat, Saxicola caprata
Northern wheatear, Oenanthe oenanthe
Red-breasted wheatear, Oenanthe bottae
Isabelline wheatear, Oenanthe isabellina
Hooded wheatear, Oenanthe monacha
Desert wheatear, Oenanthe deserti
Pied wheatear, Oenanthe pleschanka
Eastern black-eared wheatear, Oenanthe melanoleuca
Cyprus wheatear, Oenanthe cypriaca
Red-rumped wheatear, Oenanthe moesta (A)
Blackstart, Cercomela melanura
Variable wheatear, Oenanthe picata (A)
Hume's wheatear, Oenanthe albonigra (A)
White-crowned wheatear, Oenanthe leucopyga
Arabian wheatear, Oenanthe lugentoides
Finsch's wheatear, Oenanthe finschii
Mourning wheatear, Oenanthe lugens
Kurdish wheatear, Oenanthe xanthoprymna (A)
Persian wheatear, Oenanthe chrysopygia

Hypocolius
Order: PasseriformesFamily: Hypocoliidae

The hypocolius is a small Middle Eastern species. They are mainly a uniform grey colour except the males have a black triangular mask around their eyes.

Hypocolius, Hypocolius ampelinus

Sunbirds and spiderhunters
Order: PasseriformesFamily: Nectariniidae

The sunbirds and spiderhunters are very small passerine birds which feed largely on nectar, although they will also take insects, especially when feeding young. Flight is fast and direct on their short wings. Most species can take nectar by hovering like a hummingbird, but usually perch to feed.

Nile Valley sunbird, Hedydipna metallica
Palestine sunbird, Cinnyris oseus
Shining sunbird, Cinnyris habessinicus
Purple sunbird, Cinnyris asiaticus (A)

Weavers and allies
Order: PasseriformesFamily: Ploceidae

The weavers are small passerine birds related to the finches. They are seed-eating birds with rounded conical bills. The males of many species are brightly coloured, usually in red or yellow and black, some species show variation in colour only in the breeding season.

Rüppell's weaver, Ploceus galbula
Streaked weaver, Ploceus manyar (I)
Baya weaver, Ploceus philippinus (I)

Waxbills and allies
Order: PasseriformesFamily: Estrildidae

The estrildid finches are small passerine birds of the Old World tropics and Australasia. They are gregarious and often colonial seed eaters with short thick but pointed bills. They are all similar in structure and habits, but have wide variation in plumage colours and patterns.

Arabian waxbill, Estrilda rufibarba
Zebra waxbill, Amandava subflava
Red avadavat, Amandava amandava (I)
Indian silverbill, Euodice malabarica
African silverbill, Euodice cantans
Scaly-breasted munia, Lonchura punctulata (I)

Old World sparrows
Order: PasseriformesFamily: Passeridae

Old World sparrows are small passerine birds. In general, sparrows tend to be small, plump, brown or grey birds with short tails and short powerful beaks. Sparrows are seed eaters, but they also consume small insects.

House sparrow, Passer domesticus
Spanish sparrow, Passer hispaniolensis
Dead Sea sparrow, Passer moabiticus
Arabian golden sparrow, Passer euchlorus
Yellow-throated sparrow, Gymnoris xanthocollis
Sahel bush sparrow, Gymnoris dentata
Pale rockfinch, Carpospiza brachydactyla

Wagtails and pipits
Order: PasseriformesFamily: Motacillidae

Motacillidae is a family of small passerine birds with medium to long tails. They include the wagtails, longclaws and pipits. They are slender, ground feeding insectivores of open country.

Gray wagtail, Motacilla cinerea
Western yellow wagtail, Motacilla flava
Citrine wagtail, Motacilla citreola
White wagtail, Motacilla alba
Richard's pipit, Anthus richardi
African pipit, Anthus cinnamomeus
Long-billed pipit, Anthus similis
Tawny pipit, Anthus campestris
Meadow pipit, Anthus pratensis
Tree pipit, Anthus trivialis
Olive-backed pipit, Anthus hodgsoni (A)
Red-throated pipit, Anthus cervinus
Water pipit, Anthus spinoletta

Finches, euphonias, and allies
Order: PasseriformesFamily: Fringillidae

Finches are seed-eating passerine birds that are small to moderately large and have a strong beak, usually conical and in some species very large. All have twelve tail feathers and nine primaries. These birds have a bouncing flight with alternating bouts of flapping and gliding on closed wings, and most sing well.

Common chaffinch, Fringilla coelebs
Brambling, Fringilla montifringilla (A)
Hawfinch, Coccothraustes coccothraustes (A)
Common rosefinch, Carpodacus erythrinus
Sinai rosefinch, Carpodacus synoicus
Trumpeter finch, Bucanetes githaginea
Mongolian finch, Bucanetes githaginea (A)
Desert finch, Rhodospiza obsoleta
Arabian grosbeak, Rhynchostruthus percivali
European greenfinch, Chloris chloris
Olive-rumped serin, Crithagra rothschildi
Yemen serin, Crithagra menachensis
Eurasian linnet, Linaria cannabina
Yemen linnet, Linaria yemenensis
European goldfinch, Carduelis carduelis
Fire-fronted serin, Serinus pusillus (A)
Eurasian siskin, Spinus spinus

Old World buntings
Order: PasseriformesFamily: Emberizidae

The emberizids are a large family of passerine birds. They are seed-eating birds with distinctively shaped bills. Many emberizid species have distinctive head patterns.

Black-headed bunting, Emberiza melanocephala
Red-headed bunting, Emberiza bruniceps (A)
Corn bunting, Emberiza calandra
Rock bunting, Emberiza cia
Pine bunting, Emberiza leucocephalos (A)
Cinereous bunting, Emberiza cineracea
Ortolan bunting, Emberiza hortulana
Cretzschmar's bunting, Emberiza caesia
Cinnamon-breasted bunting, Emberiza tahapisi
Striolated bunting, Emberiza striolata
Reed bunting, Emberiza schoeniclus
Yellow-breasted bunting, Emberiza aureola (A)
Little bunting, Emberiza pusilla (A)
Rustic bunting, Emberiza rustica (A)

See also
List of birds
Lists of birds by region

References

Lists of birds by country
Lists of birds of Asia
Lists of birds of the Middle East
birds

birds